Swimming South Africa is the national governing body for the sport of swimming in South Africa, recognised by the FINA

Swimmers

Competitions
 Telkom SA National Aquatic Championships
 2022 SA National Swimming Championships

YouTube channel
Swimming South Africa maintains a YouTube channel, branded as SwimSA TV, where it provides live broadcasts of a variety of its swimming competitions, such as the Swimming Grand Prix and National Aquatic Championships.

See also
 Lifesaving South Africa

References

External links
 Official website

South Africa
South Africa
Swimming
Swimming in South Africa
1899 establishments in the British Empire